David Lonie (born 6 May 1979) is an American football former punter for the Green Bay Packers. He signed with the Green Bay Packers in 2007 after playing the 2006 season with the Washington Redskins, but suffered an ankle injury during the 2007 season and was placed on injured reserve. He was released in October of that year after working a settlement with the Packers. Prior to the NFL Lonie was a standout Punter with the University of California in Berkeley.

Early life and education
Lonie attended Berkeley in California.

Career
In December 2006, Lonie was released from the Washington Redskins.
In January 2008, Lonie was released from the Green Bay packers

References

1979 births
Living people
People from Gosford
Australian players of American football
American football punters
California Golden Bears football players
Green Bay Packers players